The 1939 Stanley Cup Finals was contested by the Boston Bruins and the Toronto Maple Leafs. It was Boston's first appearance in the Finals since 1930; Toronto had appeared in the previous year. Boston won the series 4–1 to win their second Stanley Cup. This was the first Stanley Cup Finals to be contested as a best-of-seven series.

Paths to the Finals
Boston defeated New York Rangers in a best-of-seven 4–3 to advance to the Finals. The Maple Leafs had to play two best-of three series; winning 2–0 against New York Americans, and 2–1 against the Detroit Red Wings to advance to the Finals.

Game summaries
Frank Brimsek held Toronto to just six goals in the 5 games.

Stanley Cup engraving
The 1939 Stanley Cup was presented to Bruins captain Cooney Weiland by NHL President Frank Calder following the Bruins 3–1 win over the Maple Leafs in game five.

The following Bruins players and staff had their names engraved on the Stanley Cup

1938–39 Boston Bruins

See also
 1938–39 NHL season

References & notes
 

 Podnieks, Andrew; Hockey Hall of Fame (2004). Lord Stanley's Cup. Bolton, Ont.: Fenn Pub. pp 12, 50. 

Stanley Cup
Stanley Cup Finals
Boston Bruins games
Toronto Maple Leafs games
April 1939 sports events
1930s in Toronto
1930s in Boston
1939 in sports in Massachusetts
1939 in Ontario
Ice hockey competitions in Boston
Ice hockey competitions in Toronto